Babia Góra  (in Polish), or Babia hora (in Slovak), literally Old Wives' or Witches' Mountain, is a massif situated on the border between Poland and Slovakia in the Western Beskid Mountains.

History
Babia Góra was first mentioned in the 15th century chronicle of Jan Długosz. It was first plotted on a map in 1558. Until the end of the 17th century most of the available information on the mountain came from folklore. According to folk tales, the mountain was the location of the witches' sabbath. The first known ascent was made in 1782 by the court astronomer of King Stanislaus Augustus, Jowin Fryderyk Alojzy Bystrzycki, Bończa coat of arms. The period of scientific investigations began in the second half of the 19th century.

Nature
Gentle from the south, steep from the north, Babia Góra is home to bear, lynx, wolf and other species; as well as alpine flora endemic at this altitude. The first attempts to protect the area were made in the 1930s. In 1933 the Nature Reserve of Babia Góra was established on the Polish side. Later, in 1954, the Babia Góra National Park (Babiogórski Park Narodowy) was established with an area of 17.04 km2. In 1976 it became one of the first Biosphere Reserves in the world. For a long time Babia Góra National Park was the smallest of the Polish national parks. In 1997 it was enlarged to 33.92 km2 and a buffer zone was created of 84.37 km2. Within the park, 10.62 km2 is under strict protection. There are calls for strengthening of cross-border cooperation with Slovakia to better protect the fragile environment of the mountain.

Climate
Babia Góra is sometimes nicknamed Matka Niepogód (Mother of Bad Weather). Located far from any other mountains of similar height that would provide a natural barrier, it is very susceptible to weather changes. Snow can remain on the northern slopes and in narrow gorges until summer.  In May 2016, a climber was killed by lightning while attempting to descend the mountain when a thunderstorm approached.

Tourism
Tourism in the region of Babia Góra is quite a recent phenomenon. The first tourists in the 19th century were mainly intellectuals from nearby Cracow. Since then the village of Zawoja has developed into an important mountain resort. However, skiing facilities are very restricted due to the protected status of the area.

Although generally relatively easy to climb, Babia Góra can be reached by a more difficult yellow route called Perć Akademików (Academics' Path). It was marked out by university scholars to examine the mountain's unique flora. Today, despite (or perhaps because of) steep climbs, chains and metal steps fixed to the rocks along sections of the trail, it is very popular with tourists.

Gallery

References

Babia Góra National Park website

See also

 List of national parks of Poland
 List of national parks of Slovakia
 List of biosphere reserves in Poland

Mountains of Poland
Mountains of Slovakia
Landforms of Lesser Poland Voivodeship
Poland–Slovakia border
International mountains of Europe
Mountains of the Western Carpathians